Kassam may refer to:

 Firoz Kassam – British entrepreneur
 Kassam Stadium – home ground of Oxford United F.C., England.
 Alternative spelling of Qassam
 Qassam rocket, a weapon used by Hamas against Israel
 By extension, any rocket used in Palestinian rocket attacks on Israel